City of Song, also known as Farewell to Love, is a 1931 British/German romance film directed by Carmine Gallone and starring Jan Kiepura, Betty Stockfeld and Hugh Wakefield. It was shot at Wembley Studios. The film's sets were designed by the art directors Oscar Friedrich Werndorff and J. Elder Wills. A German-language version was released in 1930 under the title The Singing City.

Plot
A tourist guide in Naples is taken on by an English woman impressed by his singing, and who regards him as her protégé.

Cast
 Jan Kiepura as Giovanni Cavallone 
 Betty Stockfeld as Claire Winter 
 Hugh Wakefield as Hon. Roddy Fielding 
 Heather Angel as Carmela 
 Franz Maldacea as Chi, a boy of the streets 
 Philip Easton as John, an artist 
 Miles Malleson as Theater Watchman

References

Bibliography
 Low, Rachael. Filmmaking in 1930s Britain. George Allen & Unwin, 1985.
 Wood, Linda. British Films, 1927-1939. British Film Institute, 1986.

External links

1931 films
1930s romantic musical films
British romantic musical films
Films directed by Carmine Gallone
Films set in Naples
British multilingual films
Tobis Film films
Cine-Allianz films
Films shot at Wembley Studios
British black-and-white films
1931 multilingual films
1930s English-language films
1930s British films